Five ships of the United States Navy have borne the name Bonhomme Richard or Bon Homme Richard, the French language equivalent of "Goodman Richard". The name is in reference to American Founding Father Benjamin Franklin. Franklin was responsible for writing Poor Richard's Almanack, for which the ships have been named, after the French title of the publication.

 , formerly Duc de Duras, was a frigate built in France and placed at the disposal of John Paul Jones in 1779.
 A Bon Homme Richard was to have been a Wampanoag-class cruiser built at the Washington Navy Yard. Construction was canceled in 1864.
 , was an aircraft carrier renamed Yorktown in 1943 prior to launch.
 , was an  that saw action at the end of World War II, throughout the Korean War, and through the Vietnam War.
 , was a  that was severely damaged by fire in July 2020, and decommissioned in April 2021.

See also
 

Bonhomme Richard